Stepping Toes is a 1938 British musical film directed by John Baxter and starring Hazel Ascot, Enid Stamp-Taylor and Jack Barty. The screenplay concerns a young girl who achieves her ambition to become a tap dancer.

The film was made by Two Cities Films at Shepperton Studios. Its sets were designed by John Bryan.

Cast
 Hazel Ascot as Hazel Warrington 
 Enid Stamp-Taylor as Mrs Warrington 
 Jack Barty as Joe 
 Edgar Driver as Tich 
 Ernest Butcher as Stringer 
 Richard Cooper as Kenneth Warrington 
 Ivan Samson as Mr Warrington 
 Wilson Coleman as Bob Burnham 
 John Turnbull as Representative
 Jo Masters as Chorus

References

Bibliography
 Low, Rachael. Filmmaking in 1930s Britain. George Allen & Unwin, 1985.
 Wood, Linda. British Films, 1927-1939. British Film Institute, 1986.

External links

1938 films
1938 musical films
1930s English-language films
Films directed by John Baxter
Films shot at Shepperton Studios
British musical films
British black-and-white films
1930s British films